Mount Zeil is a mountain in the Northern Territory of Australia located in the locality of Mount Zeil  in the western MacDonnell Ranges.  It is the highest peak in the Northern Territory, and the highest peak on the Australian mainland west of the Great Dividing Range.

History
It is believed that Mount Zeil was named during or following Ernest Giles's 1872 expedition, probably after Count Karl von Waldburg-Zeil (1841–1890), who had recently distinguished himself with geographic explorations in Spitzbergen; a footnote in Giles' published journal implies that the naming was instigated by his benefactor, Baron Ferdinand von Mueller.

Indigenous etymology 
The indigenous name for Mount Zeil in the Western Arrernte language is Urlatherrke, referring to the Yeperenye caterpillars.

See also

 List of mountains in Australia

References

External links
 Image of Mount Zeil on Google Maps
 Australia's highest mountains - Geoscience Australia

Zeil